Masdevallia constricta is a species of orchid endemic to Peru.

References

External links 

constricta
Endemic orchids of Peru
Taxa named by Eduard Friedrich Poeppig